This is a timeline documenting events of Jazz in the year 1977.

Events

April
 1 – The 4th Vossajazz started in Voss, Norway (April 1 – 3).

May
 25 – The 5th Nattjazz started in Bergen, Norway (May 25 – June 8).
 27 – The 6th Moers Festival started in Moers, Germany (May 27 – 30).

June
 24 – The 24th Newport Jazz Festival started in Newport, Rhode Island (June 24 – July 4).

July
 1 – The 11th Montreux Jazz Festival started in Montreux, Switzerland (July 1 – 24).
 15 – The 2nd North Sea Jazz Festival started in The Hague, Netherlands (July 15 – 17).

September
 16 – The 20th Monterey Jazz Festival started in Monterey, California (September 16 – 18).

Album releases

Muhal Richard Abrams: 1-OQA+19
Air: Air Time
Neil Ardley: Kaleidoscope of Rainbows
Derek Bailey: Company 5
Arthur Blythe: Metamorphosis
Hamiet Bluiett: Birthright
Hamiet Bluiett: SOS
Joanne Brackeen: AFT
Joanne Brackeen: Tring-a-Ling
Al Di Meola: Elegant Gypsy
Michael Franks: Sleeping Gypsy
Chico Freeman: Chico
Chico Freeman: Kings of Mali
Chico Freeman: No Time Left
David Friesen: Waterfall Rainbow
Jan Garbarek: Places
Gateway Trio: 2
Vinny Golia: Spirits In Fellowship
Globe Unity: Pearls
Louis Hayes: The Real Thing
Julius Hemphill: Blue Boye
Julius Hemphill: Raw Materials and Residuals
Julius Hemphill: Roi Boye and the Gotham Minstrels
Dave Holland: Emerald Tears
Keith Jarrett: My Song
Leroy Jenkins: Lifelong Ambitions
Leroy Jenkins: Solo Concert
Sheila Jordan: Sheila
Ernie Krivda: Satanic
Steve Lacy: Raps
Art Lande: Desert Marauders
George Lewis: Chicago Slow Dance
George Lewis: Shadowgraph
Frank Lowe: Lowe and Behold
Michael Mantler: Movies
Chuck Mangione: Feels So Good
Hugh Masekela: You Told Your Mama Not to Worry
Cecil McBee: Music from the Source
Joe McPhee: Graphics
Pat Metheny: Watercolors
Roscoe Mitchell: Nonaah
Paul Motian: Dance
Art Pepper: No Limit
Jean-Luc Ponty: Enigmatic Ocean
George Russell: Vertical Form 6
Irene Schweizer: Hexensabbat
John Scofield: East Meets West
Woody Shaw: Rosewood
John Tchicai: Real
Radka Toneff: Fairytales
Ralph Towner: Sound and Shadows
McCoy Tyner: Supertrios
James Ulmer: Revealing
Michael Urbaniak: Urbaniak
Abdul Wadud: By Myself
Collin Walcott: Grazing Dreams
Weather Report: Heavy Weather
Kenny Wheeler: Deer Wan
World Saxophone Quartet: Point Of No Return
Tommy Turk: The-Truth!!!

Deaths

 January
 2 – Erroll Garner, American pianist and composer (born 1923).
 22 – Maysa Matarazzo, Brazilian singer, composer, and actress (born 1936).

 February
 9 – Buddy Johnson, American pianist and bandleader (born 1915).
 Billy Taylor Jr., American upright bassist (born 1925).
 Julian Gould, American organist, pianist, and composer (born 1915).

 March
 23 – Bennie Green, American trombonist (born 1923).
 27 – Benny Moten, American upright bassist (born 1916).

 April
 4 – Julius Watkins, American French hornist (born 1921).
 7 – Moon Mullens, American trumpeter (born 1916).
 21 – Joe Garland, American saxophonist, composer, and arranger, "In the Mood" (born 1903).

 May
 22 – Hampton Hawes, American pianist (born 1928).
 30 – Paul Desmond, American alto saxophonist and composer (born 1924).

 June
 6 – Art Mardigan, American drummer (born 1923).

 July
 22 – Richie Kamuca, American jazz tenor saxophonist (born 1930).
 27 – Milt Buckner, American jazz pianist and organist (born 1915).

 September
 3 – Paloma Efron, Argentine singer (born 1912).
 5 – George Barnes, American guitarist (born 1921).

October
 16 – Milt Raskin, American pianist (born 1916).

 November
 18 – Teddi King, American vocalist (born 1929).
 19 – Sonny Criss, American alto saxophonist (born 1927).

 December
 5 – Rahsaan Roland Kirk, American saxophonist and multi-instrumentalist (born 1935).
 27 – Sam Brown, American guitarist (born 1939).

 Unknown date
 J. C. Moses, American drummer (born 1936).

Births

 January
 8 – Torun Eriksen, Norwegian singer.
 10 – Rhian Benson, Ghanaian-British singer and songwriter.
 13 – Elliot Mason, English trombonist.
 28 – Sissel Vera Pettersen, Norwegian singer, saxophonist, and composer.
 31 – Per Zanussi, Italians–Norwegian upright bassist, composer, and band leader, Wibutee.

 February
 2 – Evelina De Lain, Ukrain-English pianist, composer, and arranger.
 10 – Shahin Novrasli, Azerbaijani pianist.

 March
 4 – Jason Marsalis, American drummer.
 6 – Kirsti Huke, Norwegian singer and composer.
 8 – Jef Neve, Belgian pianist and composer.
 10 – Torstein Lofthus, Norwegian drummer and composer.
 21 – Farnell Newton, American composer and trumpeter.
 26 – Håvard Stubø, Norwegian guitarist.
 30 – Tor Egil Kreken, Norwegian bass, banjo, and guitar player, Wibutee and Shining.

 April
 5 – Håkon Kornstad, Norwegian tenor saxophonist and operatic tenor.
 21 – Andrea Veneziani, Italian upright bassist, composer, and arranger.
 28 – Asbjørn Lerheim, Norwegian guitarist and music teacher.
 30 – Ole Jørn Myklebust, Norwegian trumpeter, flugelhornist and vocalist.

 May
 10 – Jasper Høiby, Danish upright bassist, Phronesis.
 11 – Nicolai Munch-Hansen, Danish bassist and composer (died 2017).
 23 – Mads Berven, Norwegian guitarist.

 June
 8 – Frøy Aagre, Norwegian saxophonist.
 9 – Atle Nymo, Norwegian saxophonist, Motif and Trondheim Jazz Orchestra.
 11 – Ozan Musluoğlu, Turkish upright bassist and bass guitarist, Athena.
 30 – Brynjar Rasmussen, Norwegian clarinetist.

 July
 4 – Sevda Alekbarzadeh, Azerbaijani female singer.
 11 – Will Vinson, English alto saxophonist and composer, OWL Trio.

 August
 18 – Even Kruse Skatrud, Norwegian trombonist, Funky Butt.
 27 – Quincy Davis, American drummer.

 September
 1 – Sinne Eeg, Danish singer.
 13 – Julius Lind, Norwegian upright bassist.
 17 – Jeff Ballard, American drummer.
 20
 Dan Cray, American pianist.
 Martin Horntveth,  Norwegian drummer, composer and electronica artist, Jaga Jazzist.

 October
 2 – David Wallumrød, Norwegian pianist and organist, Needlepoint.
 6 – Matthew Bourne, British pianist and cellist.

 November
 1 – Anine Kruse, Norwegian singer and choral conductor, Pitsj.
 3 – Jane Monheit, American singer.
 5 – Ida Sand, Swedish singer and pianist.
 20 – Florian Weber, German pianist and composer.

 December
 23
 Tore Johansen, Norwegian trumpeter and composer.
 Verneri Pohjola, Finnish trumpeter.

 Unknown date
 Andreas Haddeland, Norwegian guitarist.
 Giuliano Modarelli, Italian guitarist.
 Tomeka Reid, American cellist and improvisational musician.

See also

 1970s in jazz
 List of years in jazz
 1977 in music

References

External links 
 History Of Jazz Timeline: 1977 at All About Jazz

Jazz
Jazz by year